Georgi Hristov Hristov is a Bulgarian football player, who is playing for Dimitrovgrad

External links 
  Profile

Living people
1978 births
Bulgarian footballers
Association football midfielders
FC Etar 1924 Veliko Tarnovo players